The Social and Political Front (in Spanish: Frente Social y Político) or FSP was a coalition of several left wing political parties in Colombia.

It was part of the wider Democratic Alternative (AD) movement, which in 2005 joined the Independent Democratic Pole (PDI) in order to create the Alternative Democratic Pole (PDA) alliance.

Participants
Parties or sections affiliated included the Colombian Communist Party, Present for Socialism, Movement for the Defense of the Rights of the People (MODEP), members of the Patriotic Union, and several union organizations.

Political Development
At the 2002-03-10  legislative elections, the party won parliamentary representation as one of the many small parties which participated.

Carlos Gaviria, a Colombian senator and former Colombian Constitutional Court magistrate who was also a member of the FSP, was chosen as Democratic Alternative's presidential pre-candidate.

In March 2006, the AD and the PDI subsequently decided on a common candidate for that year's May 28 elections, choosing Carlos Gaviria over the PDI's Antonio Navarro.

External links
Frente Social y Político - Official Homepage (in Spanish)

Defunct left-wing political party alliances
Defunct political party alliances in Colombia
Defunct socialist parties
Socialist parties in Colombia